Ješovec pri Kozjem ( or ) is a dispersed settlement in the hills east of Kozje in eastern Slovenia. The area is part of the historical Styria region. The Municipality of Kozje is now included in the Savinja Statistical Region.

Name
The name of the settlement was changed from Ješovec to Ješovec pri Kozjem in 1953.

Cultural heritage
A small chapel-shrine in the settlement dates to 1820.

References

External links
Ješovec pri Kozjem on Geopedia

Populated places in the Municipality of Kozje